Aaron Nagel is an American painter and the original trumpet player for punk rock/ska core act Link 80, born and raised in Berkeley, California.

He later played guitar in the band DESA with other former Link 80 members Ryan Noble, Adam Davis, and Barry Krippine.

He currently runs Two Twenty Two Design Studio and is an artist whose work has adorned two Rx Bandits albums (his paintings "Predictable" and "Look Left ...And The Battle Begun" are the covers of The Resignation and ...And the Battle Begun respectively) as well as DESA's split EP with Howards Alias and their latest album "Arriving Alive".

His paintings has been in solo and group shows across the country since 2005.

In 2016, Nagel participated in a Link 80 reunion for the Asian Man Records 20th Anniversary. On June 17 and 18, the band played two sold-out shows at the San Francisco's Bottom of the Hill. The lineup also included singer Ryan Noble, guitarists Matt Bettinelli-Olpin and Adam Davis, drummer Joey Bustos, bassists Adam Pereria and Barry Krippene, and horn players Steve Borth and Jason Lechner. Prior to the shows, a video tribute to Nick Traina was shown that the band released the video online on June 20, 2016.

Nagel is vegan straight edge.

Discography
 The Link 80 & Wet Nap Split (1995)
 Remember How It Used To Be EP (1995)
 Rumble At The Tracks EP (1996)
 17 Reasons (1996)
 Killing Katie (1997)

References

External links
Aaron Nagel / Two Twenty Two Design Studio
Interview with Sunrise Artists
Interview with Creep Machine
Studio Visit/Interview with Warholian
Interview with Curbs and Stoops
Link 80 

Living people
21st-century American painters
21st-century American male artists
American rock guitarists
American male guitarists
American male painters
Guitarists from California
Painters from California
21st-century trumpeters
21st-century American guitarists
21st-century American male musicians
Year of birth missing (living people)